Rank 1 is a Dutch trance group, formed in the Netherlands in 1997. Widely regarded as one of the originators of the Dutch trance sound, the group have produced a number of dancefloor hits since their conception. Although the two members of the group (Benno de Goeij and Piet Bervoets) had worked together before, Rank 1 (a name first used in 1999) was their first project with commercial success.

History
The first Rank 1 release was an EP containing "The Citrus Juicer" and "Black Snow". Their biggest hit commercially was the 1999 track that followed up to that EP called "Airwave", which reached No. 10 in the UK Singles Chart and No. 25 in the U.S. Billboard Hot Dance Club Play chart. This was later re-released by Rank 1 remixed with added vocals as "Breathing (Airwave 2003)", Rank 1 followed it up 11 years later with a modern style remix of Airwave in 2014 bringing the trance juggernaut into the 21st century. They also provided the base for a mash up with Donna Williams, as "True Love Never Dies", which was later vocally re-recorded using Kelly Llorenna, by Flip & Fill. In 2011, Airwave was voted the number 1 Trance Classic of all time in the Trance Top 1000 poll. In 2013, Airwave reached number 7. Later in 2021, Airwave was ranked #15 in the A State of Trance Top 1000 list.

In September 2000, they performed the track "Many Miles Too Soon" live at Trance Energy as a tribute to the late Miles Stutterheim, younger brother to Duncan Stutterheim, one of the founders of the Dutch event organiser ID&T. A year later this track was released as "Such Is Life", with added vocals by Shanokee and chosen as the anthem of Sensation 2001, the first edition where visitors were asked to appear dressed in white.

A year later they released "Awakening" as the single preceding their debut album "Symsonic". The album was released with a CD containing downtempo versions of Airwave and Such Is Life as well as a some brand new tracks including the title track, a short version of "The Citrus Juicer", "T.T.C.", "Passage To The Unknown", "Still In My Mind" and more. The album also included a DVD with a few videoclips of their singles up till then as well as their live performance at Trance Energy 2002.

2003 saw the re-release of Airwave with vocals by Aino Laos which were written by Jan Lochel. In a recorded interview, Benno explained that Breathing was released to back up the album release in Germany. By the end of the year, Rank 1 finally released their single Symsonic under the new title "It's Up To You", with added vocals by Shanokee. Unlike the classically inspired Album version, these mixes were produced in the more typical 4x4 driven uplifting Trance style, especially the "Instrumental Dub" and "Dub Vocal Mix".

The next year saw the release of the Symsonic album sampler titled "Unreleased Tracks" which contained extended mixes of "Conspiracy", "Cosmomatic" and "Down From The Deep". Shortly thereafter, Rank 1 radically changed their trademark euphoric sound and released an EP containing "Beats At Rank-1 Dotcom", a brand new Tech Trance record which ID&T would later pick up as the Trance Energy 2005 Theme. The flipside contained "After Me", a breaks driven string-laced track. The male vocals on this track were rumored to have been performed by Benno de Goeij himself. This would be the start of Rank 1's radical sound shift every few years which would lead to some genre-blending releases.

In February 2005, Rank 1 performed live at Trance Energy for the third time. During this live show they performed a track which was only made for the event. However, the crowd's reaction to it was so immense that Piet and Benno decided to release it as an official track called "Top Gear". This would happen over the summer with another two-track EP: "Opus 17" was present at the flipside and was a moody Trance track unlike its unique heavy Techno-Techtrance influenced B-side.

In February 2006, Piet was interviewed for a WiLDCHiLD event. In this interview he stated that their second album was in progress and that they had made quite some diverse tunes for it, including a breaks track with the potential title "2 Drunk 2 Funk". As of 2017, this track has not been revealed yet. Piet also clarified about the mysterious unreleased and untitled "Rank 1 vs. Marco V" collaboration track that was also mentioned in the FAQ section of their old website.

There were no official single releases during 2006 but in 2007 both "This World Is Watching Me" (with Armin van Buuren and Kush) and "Life Less Ordinary" (with Alex M.O.R.P.H.) were released. Both tracks mixed Electro-driven beats with Trancey strings and saw yet another sound shift from Rank 1. Life Less Ordinary also received an experimental Rank 1 interpretation in the guise of "A Less Ordinary Rank 1 Remix".

Early 2008 saw them release another Electro-style collaboration, this time it was a collaboration with Jochen Miller, titled "And Then...". Rank 1 made an own version of the track which they titled "Rank 1's Minimal Progressive Techno Electro Trance Mix". It was darker and heavier than the original and had a more Techno-driven twist.

The duos' track: "L.E.D There Be Light", was chosen as the Trance Energy 2009 Anthem, as well as the background track to the 2009 Electric Daisy Carnival commercial. This track combined the soft-loud synth dynamic from And Then with sweeping strings and more Trancey elements. It leaked out in late 2008, which led to the early release of the "Special Download Mix". The track was officially released in February 2009, with remixes by Wippenberg, Marcel Woods as well as an alternative "Laserlight Rework" by Rank 1 themselves. In 2010, the song was formally remixed by Cold Blank. It is the most successful remix to date, reaching No. 10 on Beatport's Top 100 Electro House Chart. It also landed a release on Ministry Of Sound's Trance Nation 2010 compilation. There were also released some another remixes by tyDi & Trent McDermott, Yvan & Dan Daniel and LoKo. Their next track, "Symfo," was the self-titled Sunrise Festival Theme 2009 and was released only five months after L.E.D. There Be Light. This track received remixes by Marcus Schossow and The Prime Sins, as well as a more House-driven "Rank 1's That Side Mix".

In 2010, Rank 1 and Miller released another collaboration which was chosen as the theme to the Polish Entrance 2010 event called "The Great Escape". Armin van Buuren even played it during his short satellite-connection gig during Trance Energy 2010. On February 11, Benno tweeted there would be an alternative non-Trance Rank 1 Remix of The Great Escape but as of 2017, this version has not been revealed yet. Whether it has been cancelled or not remains unclear. Two weeks later, Benno tweeted that they would start their own radioshow. Indeed, April 6 saw the start of their monthly one-hour radioshow "Rank 1's Radio Rush" on Afterhours FM, which is aired every first Tuesday of the month between 20:00 - 21:00 CET. A forum on the Rank 1 Hyve contains an updated track list of all the episodes, as well as a list of the (old) Rank 1 Classics played so far. As the summer approached, another collaboration saw the light of day, this time Rank 1 teamed up with Nic Chagall and Wippenberg to release "100", the self-explanatory track to celebrate High Contrast Recordings reaching the 100th milestone release. The vinyl release of the track was a limited edition pressed on gold.

Similar to 2006, 2011 saw no official single releases.

The two singles to follow this "radio silence" were released in February and March respectively, with the Trouse driven "Wild And Perfect Day" providing their third collaboration with Jochen Miller (with vocal support by Sarah Bettens) whilst "Witness" was their vocal Trance collaboration in tandem with Cerf, Mitiska & Jaren. On April 23 the guys announced they had almost finished a brand new track, so far without vocals. After various cryptic Facebook and Twitter updates alike, on the 15th of October they finally revealed that their third 2012 release would be a Rank 1 solo track called "7 Instead Of 8". The single's title refers to its 7/8 time signature.

On December 21, they revealed a 30-second snippet of their collaboration 'Elements Of Nature' with Belgium Trance artist M.I.K.E. This collaboration was initiated by a Twitter user under the name 'Ramballo'. This single was released by the end of January 2013 and received much positive feedback for its Classic Trance vibe and was even rated an 8.5/10 by the DJ Mag. On March 13, Conjure One revealed that a Rank 1 Remix for his new single "Under The Gun" would debut during Rank 1's set at ASOT #600 in Mumbai. Just one day later, Rank 1 themselves announced a brand new single 'Floorlifter' to debut on the very same event. A month later the Rank 1 Remix for Italian Trance artist Giuseppe Ottaviani's single 'Love Will Bring It All Around' was released. Over the course of the summer, Rank 1 announced to be working on a third single. As October passed by, they revealed their new single titled '13.11.11' which combined the track's duration with its release date and tempo.

Their first 2014 single was released on March 17, a collaboration with the German producer Dennis Sheperd titled 'Freudenrausch'. On August 8, their track Airwave was re-released in a modern 129 BPM rework to celebrate 15 years of the Rank 1 project: 'Airwave (21st Century Mix)' peaked at #4 in the BeatPort Trance Top 100 chart. On December 16, DI.FM aired the 56th Radio Rush episode, which was also the radioshow's finale.

Early 2015 saw M.I.K.E. share an instagram picture of a project he was working on: the title of the project read "MIKEPush vs Rank1 - #JUNO Tracks". On June 18, this collaboration was revealed as the guys' newest collaboration "Juno". It debuted on episode #718 of Armin van Buuren's A State Of Trance Radioshow as 'Tune Of The Week'. On September 13 both Rank 1 and M.I.K.E. tweeted the same cryptic message: a google search of the sentences they both used seemed to be referring to zenith. A couple of weeks later it turned out that the guys had indeed teamed up again for a third collaboration which they named "Zenith": it was premiered by Markus Schulz on his Global DJ Broadcast radioshow. It would go on to garner massive support from Markus throughout the next few months.

At the end of May 2016, Rank 1 used a cryptic tweet to reveal a new single: it merely read "03.06.2016" and was accompanied by coverart depicting a highway at dawn. In the following days, they revealed they had finished a brand new rework of their old 2000 Remix for Cygnus X - Superstring. Armin van Buuren granted them Tune Of The Week status once more on ASOT #766 and during the episode, Benno gave a short background story on the track: the piano they used in Superstring was the same one that Armin used to play as a child.
 A month later, Torsten Stenzel, better known as York, released his album Traveller which featured a collaboration with Rank 1 titled "This World Is So Amazing", alongside vocals by Lola Grover, The collaboration was officially released on November 1. The package included remixes by Maglev and Dreamy alongside the original mix.

A few silent months followed. Then, on July 7, 2017, Rank 1 revealed that they would be part of the Dreamstate SoCal line-up, a multi-day Trance event that would take place in the final weekend of November. On Saturday November 25th their first live performance in 4,5 years time took place and the guys seized the opportunity to showcase four brand new tracks alongside the untitled track they performed over various festivals during summer '12. As of December 9, no new material has been released.

On July 27, 2018, Cosmic Gate released their remix of L.E.D. There Be Light, but other than that there were no new releases that year.

When 2019 had got underway, the guys released a brand new single at last: for this occasion they finally delivered a collaboration with Marco V which they titled "We Finally Met". It was premiered on ASOT episode #902 on February 21 and was made Tune Of The Week by Armin. It was the only release they put out in 2019.

For the celebration of the 950th episode of his radioshow, Armin decided he wanted to do something special so he asked Piet & Benno if they were interested in doing a liveshow at the Jaarbeurs to which they agreed. Two and a half years onward from Dreamstate the guys went live again, albeit this time they combined the live playing with some mega-mixing tricks to fit 11 tracks into 30 minutes: they played two brand new untitled tracks, as well as two tracks from their Dreamstate show. On July 31, the live set was released on Spotify and with it, the previously untitled tracks finally received names. In order of appearance, these were: "Transatlantic Communication", "Predictive Memory", "No Name" and "Paris Nice Cannes".

Over the course of July 2021, 15 years after This World Is Watching Me, Armin and Rank 1 released a second collaboration titled 'The Greater Light To Rule The Night'. It was premiered on A State Of Trance #1027 as Tune Of The Week.

Around mid-April 2022, Armin announced his upcoming mix compilation A State Of Trance 2022 which would premiere Aly & Fila and JES - Sunrise (Rank 1 Remix). It was the first Rank 1 Remix in nine years, the last one being Love Will Bring It All Around in 2013.

Discography

Albums
 2002 Symsonic including "Symsonic", "Cosmomatic", "Conspiracy", "T.T.C.", "Down From The Deep", "Equilibrium", "Passage To The Unknown" and "Still In My Mind"
 2020 Live at ASOT 950 including "Transatlantic Communication", "Predictive Memory", "No Name" and "Paris Nice Cannes"

Singles

As Rank 1
 1999 "Black Snow / The Citrus Juicer"
 1999 "Airwave" (Innercity Theme 1999)
 2001 "Such Is Life" (with Shanokee) (Sensation Anthem 2001)
 2002 "Awakening" (with Olga Zegers)
 2003 "Breathing (Airwave 2003)" (with Aino Laos)
 2003 "It's Up To You (Symsonic)" (with Shanokee)
 2004 "Beats At Rank-1 Dotcom (Trance Energy Anthem 2005) / After Me"
 2004 "Unreleased Tracks From The Album Symsonic" (inc. Extended Mixes for "Conspiracy", "Cosmomatic" and "Down From The Deep")
 2005 "Opus 17 / Top Gear"
 2007 "This World Is Watching Me" (with Armin van Buuren and Kush)
 2007 "Life Less Ordinary" (with Alex M.O.R.P.H. and Fragma)
 2008 "And Then..."(with Jochen Miller)
 2009 "L.E.D There Be Light" (Trance Energy Anthem 2009)
 2009 "Symfo" (Sunrise Festival Theme 2009)
 2010 "The Great Escape" (with Jochen Miller) (Entrance Theme 2010)
 2010 "100" (with Nic Chagall and Wippenberg)
 2012 "Wild And Perfect Day" (with Jochen Miller and Sarah Bettens)
 2012 "Witness" (with Cerf, Mitiska & Jaren)
 2012 "7 Instead Of 8"
 2013 "Elements Of Nature" (with M.I.K.E.)
 2013 "Floorlifter"
 2013 "13.11.11"
 2014 "Freudenrausch" (with Dennis Sheperd)
 2014 "Airwave (21st Century Mix)"
 2015 "Juno" (with M.I.K.E.)
 2015 "Zenith" (with M.I.K.E.)
 2016 "Superstring"
 2016 "This World Is So Amazing" (with York and Lola)
 2019 "We Finally Met" (with Marco V)
 2021 "The Greater Light To Rule The Night" (with Armin van Buuren)

As R.O.O.S.
 1997 "Instant Moments (Skyline Mix)"
 1997 "Instant Moments (Waiting For)" (with Evelyne Derks)
 1998 "Living in a Dream"
 1999 "Body, Mind & Spirit"
 2002 "Instant Moments 2002"

As Pedro & Benno
 1997 "Scream For Love"
 1998 "Talkin' To You"
 1999 "Speechless"

As A.I.D.A.
 1999 "Far And Away"
 1999 "Far And Away/Merit"
 1999 "Remember Me/Corvana"

Other aliases
 1997 "Human Beast", as Simplistic Mind
 1997 "Baby Freak", as Precious People
 1997 "Reflections of Love", as Precious People
 1998 "To the Church", as Two Disciples
 1998 "I Know You're There", as Tritone (with DJ Misjah)
 1998 "Ssst... (Listen)", as Jonah (with DJ Misjah)
 1998 "Subspace Interference", as Control Freaks (with DJ Tiesto)
 1998 "Play it Rough", as System Eight (with Michel Keyser)
 1999 "Human Planetarium", as Gualagara
 2000 "Yeah... Right", as Jonah (with DJ Misjah)
 2000 "Straight to the Point", as SPX (with DJ Misjah)
 2003 "The Anthem 2003", as Sensation
 2003 "Perfect Blend / Deep Ranger", as Mac J
 2004 "Womanizer / Nightware", as Mac J
 2005 "Dreamchild / Flash", as Johan Gielen

Remixes
 1999 "Reachers Of Civilization", by York
 2000 "Blue Lagoon", by Tunnel Allstars
 2000 "Cry", by System F (with Saskia Lie-Atjam)
 2000 "Perfect Moment", by Mary Griffin
 2000 "Superstring", by Cygnus X
 2000 "Let Me Be Your Fantasy", by Baby D
 2000 "It's My Turn", by Angelic (with Amanda O'Riordan)
 2000 "Home", by Chakra (with Kate Cameron) (Unreleased)
 2001 "Far Away", by Ayumi Hamasaki
 2001 "Underwater", by Delerium (with Rani Kamal)
 2002 "Ligaya", by Gouryella (Unreleased)
 2002 "Dreamland", by Nu NRG
 2002 "Dearest", by Ayumi Hamasaki
 2002 "Sound Of Love", by Marc Aurel
 2002 "Mind Made Up", by Jam X & De Leon
 2003 "Journey Of Life", by Push
 2004 "Touch Me", by Angel City (with Lara McAllen)
 2005 "Lyteo", by Mr Sam (with Kirsty Hawkshaw)
 2005 "Humanity", by ATB (with Tiff Lacey)
 2006 "This Way", by Ronald van Gelderen
 2006 "Love Kills", by Freddie Mercury
 2007 "Analog Feel", by Cosmic Gate
 2007 "The Future", by JOOP
 2007 "Touch The Sun", by Alex Bartlett and Andy Guess (with Anthya)
 2008 "Undone", by Anton Sonin & AMX (with Sari)
 2008 "On Fire", by Marcel Woods (with MC Da Silva)
 2008 "Embrace Me", by Ronald van Gelderen
 2008 "Lost Luggage", by Leon Bolier and Jonas Steur
 2010 "Safe (Wherever You Are)", by Velvetine
 2010 "24 Hours", by Mat Zo
 2010 "Fire Wire", by Cosmic Gate
 2011 "My Enemy", by Super8 & Tab (with Julie Thompson)
 2013 "Under The Gun", by Conjure One (with Leigh Nash)
 2013 "Love Will Bring It All Around", by Giuseppe Ottaviani (with Eric Lumiere)
 2022 "Sunrise", by Aly & Fila (with Jes Brieden)

DJ compilations
 2013 A State Of Trance 600: The Expedition (CD4 mixed by Rank 1) (Armada)
 2011 Trance Nation: Rank 1 (Ministry of Sound UK)
 2010 EnTrance presents High Contrast (CD1 mixed by Rank 1) (High Contrast Recordings)
 2009 Trance Energy 2009 (CD2 mixed by Rank 1)
 2008 Talla 2XLC In Touch With Rank 1 - Techno Club Vol. 28 (CD2 mixed by Rank 1)
 2008 High Contrast presents Rank 1 (High Contrast Recordings)
 2005 Rank 1 ? Live Mix @ Castle Dance (Dance Planet Ltd)
 2004 Matt Darey & Rank 1 - Ultimate Trance (Central Station)
 2004 Rank 1 - A Trip In Trance 4 (Hi Bias Records Inc.)
 2004 ID&T presents Rank 1 (Universal TV)

References

External links
 Discography
 Official site
 Discography (Including 350+ (all) soundsamples)
 Myspace

Dutch DJs
Dutch trance music groups
Remixers
Musical groups established in 1997
Dutch dance music groups
Dutch techno music groups
Electronic dance music DJs